Gioli is an Italian surname. Notable people with the surname include: 
 
 Francesco Gioli (1846–1922), Italian painter
 Luigi Gioli (1854–1947), Italian painter
 Matilde Gioli (born 1989), Italian actress 
 Simona Gioli (born 1977), Italian volleyball player

  
Italian-language surnames